Samih Onsi Sawiris (born January 28, 1957) is an Egyptian-born Montenegrin businessman, investor and billionaire and the second of three sons of Onsi Sawiris, the other two being Naguib Sawiris and Nassef Sawiris. He is the former executive chairman of the board of directors and CEO of Orascom Development Holding AG.

As of 2015 his net worth was estimated at US$850 million, which at the time made him the 26th richest person in Africa.

Education and career
Sawiris received his Engineering Diploma in Engineering management from the Technical University of Berlin in 1980.

He founded National Marine Boat Factory, followed by Orascom Projects for Touristic Development in 1996 and Orascom Hotels and Development in 1998; the latter two companies later merged to form Orascom Development Holding AG. He has served as CEO and chairman of Orascom Development Holding AG from its incorporation, and stepped down in December 2021. His son succeeded him. Through his  organisation, Sawiris developed holiday resorts in Egypt and Switzerland.

In 2011 he took a 12.5% stake in Swiss football club FC Luzern. In 2017, he invested in Bidroom, a membership-based online hotel booking platform.

In December 2019, he acquired Thomas Cook (Germany) through his Raiffeisen Touristik (RT) Group, which he had bought 74.9% of its shares back in 2014.

Personal life
Sawiris became a Montenegrin citizen in 2011. He is Coptic Christian.

References

1957 births
Living people
Egyptian businesspeople
Montenegrin businesspeople
Coptic Orthodox Christians from Egypt
Egyptian billionaires
Egyptian emigrants to Montenegro
Samih
People from Sohag Governorate